The Education Minister of the Gaza Strip is an office, created in June 2007, following the Fatah-Hamas conflict in Gaza and split between Palestinian cabinets in Gaza Strip and West Bank. The first Education Minister of the Hamas Authority in the Gaza Strip was named Osama al-Muzayni, part of the Hamas government of June 2007.

The office of the education ministry in Gaza was destroyed in an Israeli air strike, part of offensive Operation Cast Lead.

In 2012, during Hamas government reshuffle, Osama al-Muzayni kept his position.

Education Ministers (Gaza Strip)

See also
 Education Minister of the Palestinian National Authority

References

External links
Ministry Website (Gaza Strip)

Government ministers of the Gaza Strip
Education ministers